George McLeod (22 August 1879 – 3 March 1959) was an Australian rules footballer who played for St Kilda and Essendon during the early years of the Victorian Football League (VFL).

McLeod, originally from South Yarra, started his VFL career at St Kilda in 1897. He left the club at the end of the season but returned for another stint in 1901. Before arriving at Essendon in 1910, McLeod played football for the Railway club (Lyell District Football Association) in Tasmania. He represented the state at the 1908 Melbourne Carnival and that year also won the LDFA "best all round player" award. He was a follower in Essendon's 1911 premiership team in place of captain Allan Belcher who was injured and a back pocket in their premiership the following season.

See also
 1908 Melbourne Carnival

References

External links 

Holmesby, Russell and Main, Jim (2007). The Encyclopedia of AFL Footballers. 7th ed. Melbourne: Bas Publishing.
Essendon Football Club profile

1879 births
Australian rules footballers from Victoria (Australia)
St Kilda Football Club players
Essendon Football Club players
Essendon Football Club Premiership players
South Yarra Football Club players
1959 deaths
Brunswick Football Club players
Two-time VFL/AFL Premiership players